Ithikkara is a scenic place in Kollam district, Kerala, India about 13 km from Kollam city. It received its name from Ithikkara River. 

Ithikkara has the strong connection with the legend of Ithikkara Pakki, well known for his feats as a great robber and a friend of Kayamkulam Kochunni. He robbed only the richest people and then distributed the treasure to the needy people.

The Ithikkara River originates from the low hills situated near Madathuri kunnu at about +240 m above M.S.L and from the hills located south-west of Kulathupuzha. The Vattapparambu stream and the Kunduman thodu are its important tributaries.

The latter joins the Ithikkara at Plakkadu about 200 m upstream of Ithikkara Bridge on N.H.47. The river has a north-westerly course up to the Irattur Malai from where it flows west up to Pampira and then takes a more or less south-westerly course till its exits into the Paravur Kayal near Meenad.

The river passes through the villages of Vayala, Pampira, Ayur, Thiruvambhagam, Atturkonam and Adichanallore. Kottiyam, Chathannoor and Chadayamangalam are some of the important places in the basin.

The river has a length  of 56 km and a catchment area of  642 km2. The complete catchment lies within the state.

Ithikkara Block Panchayath – On 1 April 1961, Ithikkara Block Panchayath was established. It has following panchayaths: Poothakkulam, Kalluvathukkal, Chathannoor, Nedumpana, and Adichanallur.

Location
It is on the National Highway 66 between Chathannoor town and Kollam City. There are regular bus services from Kollam City. Nearest major railway station is Kollam Junction. Paravur railway station is 14 km away. 
 
The nearest airport is Thiruvananthapuram International Airport (55 km).

Industries

There were large-scale industries, like tile factories, cashew factories, and clay-modelling. Now few left and many other small-scale industries have opened.

Nearby institutions and hospitals
 Royal Multi Speciality Hospital (500m)
 Holy Cross Hospital, Kottiyam (3 km)
 KIMS Hospital, Sithara Junction Mylakkadu, Kottiyam (2Km)
 TB Hospital (6 km)
 Azeezia Medical College, Meyannor (10 km)
 Travancore Engineering College (9 km)
 MES Institute of Technology & Management (2 km)
 Younus College of Engineering & Technology (8 km)
 Nehru Memorial Higher Secondary School, Kaithakuzhy (2 km)
 KSRTC Bus Station, Chathannoor (3 km)
 The Raviz 5 Star Resort, Thevally, Kollam (15 km). 360 virtual tour
 Pullichira Church, Mayyanadu (5 km)
 Kunambayikulam Temple (8 km)
 Varkala Beach (19 km)
 Paravur Backwaters (9 km)
 Thiru Aarattu Madannada, Ithikkara, Mylakkadu

References

External links
Google Maps

Villages in Kollam district